Gnathotrichus is a genus of ambrosia beetles in the family Curculionidae. There are at least 40 described species in Gnathotrichus.

Species
These 41 species belong to the genus Gnathotrichus:

 Gnathotrichus aciculatus Blackman, 1931b c
 Gnathotrichus alni Blackman, 1931b c
 Gnathotrichus alniphagus Wood, 1984e c
 Gnathotrichus barbifer Schedl, 1967d c
 Gnathotrichus bituberculatus Blandford, 1904 c
 Gnathotrichus castaneus Schedl, 1972d c
 Gnathotrichus consentaneus Blandford, 1904 c
 Gnathotrichus consobrinus Eichhoff, 1878b c
 Gnathotrichus corthyliformis Schedl, 1964m c
 Gnathotrichus corthyloides Schedl, 1951d c
 Gnathotrichus deleoni Blackman, 1942a c
 Gnathotrichus dentatus Wood, 1967d c
 Gnathotrichus denticulatus Blackman, 1931 i c b
 Gnathotrichus fimbriatus Schedl, 1955e c
 Gnathotrichus fossor Bright & Poinar, 1994 c
 Gnathotrichus frontalis Schedl, 1972d c
 Gnathotrichus herbertfranzi Schedl, 1972d c
 Gnathotrichus imitans Wood, 1967 i c
 Gnathotrichus impressus Schedl, 1977e c
 Gnathotrichus longicollis Schedl, 1951m c
 Gnathotrichus longipennis Eichhoff, 1878b c
 Gnathotrichus longiusculus Schedl, 1951m c
 Gnathotrichus materiarius (Fitch, 1858) i c b (American utilizable wood bark beetle)
 Gnathotrichus nanulus Schedl, 1972d c
 Gnathotrichus nanus Eichhoff, 1878b c
 Gnathotrichus nimifrons Wood, 1967 i c
 Gnathotrichus nitidifrons Hopkins, 1905b c
 Gnathotrichus obnixus Schedl, 1939h c
 Gnathotrichus obscurus Wood, 1974a c
 Gnathotrichus occidentalis Blackman (Hopkins in), 1931b c
 Gnathotrichus omissus Wood, 1974a c
 Gnathotrichus perniciosus Wood, 1967d c
 Gnathotrichus pilosus (LeConte, 1868) i c b
 Gnathotrichus primus Wood & Bright, 1992 c
 Gnathotrichus quadrituberculatus Schedl, 1951m c
 Gnathotrichus retusus (LeConte, 1868) i c b (western pinewood stainer)
 Gnathotrichus saltoni Blackman, 1938a c
 Gnathotrichus sericeus Bright & Skidmore, 1997 c
 Gnathotrichus sextuberculatus Schedl, 1951m c
 Gnathotrichus sulcatus (LeConte, 1868) i c b (western hemlock wood stainer)
 Gnathotrichus vafer Schedl, 1975d c

Data sources: i = ITIS, c = Catalogue of Life, g = GBIF, b = Bugguide.net

References

Further reading

External links

 

Scolytinae
Articles created by Qbugbot